A list of Portuguese films that were first released in 2001.

See also
2001 in Portugal

References

2001
Lists of 2001 films by country or language
2001 in Portugal